Kill Your Darlings (KYD) is an Australian online literary magazine dedicated to arts and culture. Kill Your Darlings was established in March 2010 with a mission of "reinvigorating and re-energising this medium – to shake it up, if you like, and publish literature that bites back". It publishes new fiction and commentary, memoir, interviews and reviews. The magazine name comes from a quote regularly attributed to the American novelist William Faulkner: ‘In writing, you must kill all your darlings.’ The publishing director is Rebecca Starford, and the editor is Alan Vaarwerk.

History
Kill Your Darlings was established in March 2010, supported by funding from the Australia Council. Founding editors Rebecca Starford, Hannah Kent, and Jo Case set out to create a new kind of print literary journal. The first issue was positively received.

In 2017, after 29 issues, KYD ceased publishing its flagship quarterly print magazine in order to focus on its growing online publishing program. In 2019 KYD began publishing a yearly print collection of short stories titled New Australian Fiction. The 2019 and 2020 editions were both well received. The Age/Sydney Morning Herald described the 2019 edition as ‘a consistently high-quality collection', and said of the 2020 edition: ‘At a clutch moment in Australian publishing, the volume certainly has its finger on the pulse.'

KYD contributors include Benjamin Law, Clementine Ford, Jane Caro, Ron Rash, Antony Loewenstein, Chris Womersley, Rebecca Shaw, Gideon Haigh, Krissy Kneen, Nayuka Gorrie, Ellena Savage, Maria Turmarkin, Jennifer Down, Omar Musa, Toni Jordan, Jack Cowell, Melanie Joosten and Jon Bauer. 

KYD produces a regular podcast, provides professional writing services such as online workshops, mentorships and manuscript assessments, and hosts literary events.

Awards

KYD runs two annual writing awards: the New Critic Award and the School Writing Prize. The awards are designed to support the development of early-career writers, give them the opportunity to work with industry professionals, and assist them in creating publishing pathways in the future.

References

Further reading 
Brewer, Tim. "Inventively fearless Review of Kill Your Darlings Issue 4," Australian Book Review, March 2011.
"‘Kill Your Darlings’ opens online store'" in Books + Publishing website, at http://www.booksellerandpublisher.com.au/DetailPage.aspx?type=item&id=27130 .
Discussion from Emerging Writers' Festival at Victoria University, May 2013, at https://web.archive.org/web/20130707055244/http://www.emergingwritersfestival.org.au/category/the-emerging-writer/ .
Conversation with Rebecca Starford and Hannah Kent, Kill Your Darlings, https://www.killyourdarlings.com.au/article/conversation-with-rebecca-starford-hannah-kent/

External links 
 

Literary magazines published in Australia
Online magazines
English-language magazines
Magazines established in 2010
2010 establishments in Australia
Magazines published in Melbourne